WVSP-FM (94.1 MHz, "Priority Auto Sports Radio") is a sports formatted broadcast radio station licensed to Yorktown, Virginia, United States, serving The Peninsula, Middle Peninsula and Southside of Hampton Roads.  WVSP-FM is owned and operated by Max Broadcast Group Holdings, LLC. WVSP's studios are located on Greenwich Road in Virginia Beach, while its transmitter is located in Newport News Park in York County near Colonial National Historical Park.

History

The station had originally signed on in 1975 as WYVA-FM, serving Yorktown, Virginia, with a country format. In 1986, it changed call letters to WKEZ while retaining the country format. On October 14, 1991, it began a time-brokered simulcast with then AAA-formatted WKOC "The Coast" in Norfolk.  The next year, the simulcast was ended and the station switched to adult contemporary as WXEZ, "EZ94".  The transmitter tower was moved to give the station a better signal over the Tidewater area.  The station was sold in the mid 1990s to Barnstable Broadcasting and switched to an urban gospel music format as "Star 94.1" in August 2000.  Barnstable later sold its Tidewater market stations to locally-based Max Media.

On October 5, 2009, WXEZ swapped formats with WGH (1310 AM) and became a sports radio station, and at that time changed their call letters to WVSP-FM. With this change, there are now two sports stations on the FM dial in Hampton Roads. ESPN Radio also gained an improved coverage area much greater than when they were located on 1310 AM. The black gospel format moved to 1310 AM.

On February 1, 2023, the station rebranded as "Priority Auto Sports Radio", as part of a naming rights deal with local automotive dealer chain Priority Automotive, one of the few such deals involing a radio station's branding. WVSP-FM's programming, including its ESPN Radio affiliation, did not change.

References

External links
ESPN Radio 94.1 Online

Sports radio stations in the United States
VSP-FM
ESPN Radio stations
Radio stations established in 1975
Max Media radio stations
1975 establishments in Virginia